RATS may refer to:

 RATS (software), Regression Analysis of Time Series, a statistical package
 Robot Astronomy Talk Show, an animated educational series that's part of NASA's IRrelevant Astronomy vodcast
 Regional Anti-Terrorist Structure, the Shanghai Cooperation Organisation's anti-terrorism branch

See also
Rat (disambiguation)
The Rat (disambiguation)
The Rats (disambiguation)